James Burke Fairey (born September 22, 1944) is a former outfielder in Major League Baseball. He played from 1968-1973 for the Los Angeles Dodgers and Montreal Expos.

External links

1944 births
Living people
Albuquerque Dodgers players
Albuquerque Dukes players
American expatriate baseball players in Canada
Arizona Instructional League Dodgers players
Baseball players from South Carolina
Hawaii Islanders players
Los Angeles Dodgers players
Major League Baseball outfielders
Minor league baseball managers
Montreal Expos players
People from Orangeburg, South Carolina
Santa Barbara Dodgers players
Spokane Indians players
Tacoma Twins players
Texas Rangers scouts
Vancouver Mounties players